Mungacharla is a village in NTR district of the Indian state of Andhra Pradesh. It is located in Nandigama mandal.

References 

Villages in NTR district